The Grotesque is a 1989 gothic fiction novel by British author Patrick McGrath. It was adapted into a 1995 film starring Alan Bates, Lena Headey, Theresa Russell and Sting.

Plot summary
Wheelchair-using Sir Hugo Coal narrates this tale of vice and murder at stately Crook Manor. Unable to communicate with those around him, the quirky Sir Hugo watches and listens, recounting recent events that began with his daughter's engagement, followed by the disappearance of her fiancé and the subsequent investigation. Of particular note is new butler Fledge, whom Sir Hugo believes is not only the cause of the troubles at the estate, but seeking to replace him as lord of the manor and in Lady Harriet's bed.

Reviews
From Publishers Weekly:
Witty, weird and highly enjoyable, this gothic British tale is aptly titled. The set-up is macabre: a distinguished paleontologist is brain-damaged and slowly turning into a vegetable. He cannot speak, but narrates an interior monologue of all he sees and hears: a lot of sexual shenanigans and a particularly grisly murder, all centered around "Fledge," the butler, who has ambitions. The stylistic joke is that all these horrors take place in a quaint, genteel English country setting, where the village is "Pock-on-the-Fling," the pub, "The Hodge and Purlet" and the barrister, "Sir Fleckley Tome." However deadly the deed, the language is always decorous and impeccably mannered. The result is strangely hilarious--as if a Stephen King story were being told in the manner of a latter-day Anthony Trollope. 

From The Sunday Times (United Kingdom):
Magnificently grim ... [McGrath] serves up this cold slice of modern Gothic with the deranged relish of a Poe but also the acrid irony of a Waugh.

References

1989 British novels
British Gothic novels
British novels adapted into films
Poseidon Press books
1989 debut novels
Works set in country houses